Sergej Evljuskin (tr., Sergey Yevlyushkin; born 4 January 1988) is a professional footballer who plays as a central midfielder for Oberliga Niedersachsen club FSV Schöningen. He represented Germany internationally at various youth levels. He was called up to the Kyrgyzstan senior national team in 2015 but did not make an appearance.

Early life 
Evljuskin was born in the village of Alekseyevka, Jayyl District, formerly known as Kalinin District, in the Kirghiz Soviet Socialist Republic, to a Russian-Kyrgyzstani father and an ethnic German mother from Kazakhstan. He and his family immigrated to Germany in 1990.

Club career 
Evljuskin spent six-and-a-half years at Hessen Kassel, mostly in the fourth-tier Regionalliga Südwest. He left the club and retired from playing in January 2021. He returned to playing on amateur level at the six-tier Landesliga Braunschweig in the 2021–22 season. He continued playing for FSV Schöningen as it was promoted to the fifth-tier Oberliga Niedersachsen for the 2022–23 season.

International career 
Evljuskin was called up in May 2015 by Aleksandr Krestinin to represent Kyrgyzstan national team in the 2018 FIFA World Cup Qualifiers against Bangladesh and Australia.

References

External links 
 
 

Living people
1988 births
German people of Russian descent
Soviet emigrants to Germany
Kazakhstani emigrants to Germany
German people of Kyrgyzstani descent
German people of Kazakhstani descent
Kyrgyzstani people of Russian descent
People from Chüy Region
Kyrgyzstani footballers
German footballers
Association football midfielders
Kyrgyzstan international footballers
Germany youth international footballers
3. Liga players
Regionalliga players
VfL Wolfsburg II players
Oberliga (football) players
FC Hansa Rostock players
SV Babelsberg 03 players
KSV Hessen Kassel players
Kyrgyzstani expatriate footballers